Desulfonatronovibrio hydrogenovorans is a bacterium, the type species of its genus. It is an alkaliphilic, sulfate-reducing and motile bacterium. It is obligately sodium-dependent and its type strain is Z-7935 (= DSM 9292).

References

Further reading

Whitman, William B., et al., eds. Bergey's manual® of systematic bacteriology. Vol. 5. Springer, 2012.
Pikuta, E. V.; Lysenko, A. M.; Zhilina, T. N., 1997: Distribution of Desulfonatronovibrio hydrogenovorans in soda lakes of Tuva. Mikrobiologiya. 66(2): 262–268, Ch- Il

External links

LPSN
Type strain of Desulfonatronovibrio hydrogenovorans at BacDive -  the Bacterial Diversity Metadatabase

Bacteria described in 1997

Desulfovibrionales